"The Way It Goes" is a single released by the British Rock band Status Quo in 1999. It was included on the album Under the Influence.

The Under the Influence trailer has segments of "Twenty Wild Horses", "Under the Influence", "Round And Round", "Little White Lies" and "Keep 'Em Coming. The track "Sea Cruise" was written and originally recorded by Huey Smith. A second version of the single was planned but canceled, replacing "Sea Cruise" with a cover of "I Knew the Bride" (a cover of Dave Edmunds 1977 hit).

Track listing 
 "The Way It Goes"(edit) (Rossi/Frost)  (3.20)
 "Sea Cruise" (H Smith)(3.07)
 "Under the Influence album trailer" (3.45)

Charts

References 

Status Quo (band) songs
1999 singles
Songs written by Francis Rossi
1999 songs